Abbas Yari is an iranian journalist and film critic. He was born in Arak in 1951. He graduated as a cameraman at the Superior School of Cinema in 1975. Abbas Yari started his professional career as a journalist, and worked until 1981 for the newspapers Sobh e Emrouz, Tehran Mosavvar and Kayhan. In 1968, while still  a student, he presided the cultural foundation for youth in his hometown, Arak, being responsible of organizing journalistic, poetry, theater and lectures related events. In the early nineteen seventies, he is interested in theater and writes and directs several plays. Shortly after, he turns his interest to cinema, being in charge for the cinema section of the weekly Ettela'at Haftegi in 1976-1977, and chief editor for the magazine Setareh cinema between 1973 and 1977.

He is one of the three founders of Film (Iranian magazine), the oldest post-revolutionary film magazine in Iran (founded in 1982 with Houshang Golmakani and Massoud Mehrabi).. He was the executive director of this magazine from the start till 2021. In 1993, Film (Iranian magazine) began to print an English version of the magazine for its international readers, FILM International, the only English magazine solely about Iranian cinema.

In 2021 after the death of Massoud Mehrabi, he left Film (Iranian magazine) to start a new magazine called FILM EMROOZ alongside Houshang Golmakani. 

In 1988, he was one of the founding members of the foundation of art critics and writers about Iranian cinema. Between 2002 and 2005, he organized the Iranian cinema museum in Tehran.

Notes 

Iranian journalists
Living people
Year of birth missing (living people)